This list of terrorist incidents is limited to bombings and does not include other forms of attacks.

January 
January 3 A car bomb killed 20 Shiites and injured 50 others.
January 17 Bombs killed 21 people across Iraq.
January 22 Car bombs killed 17 people and injured dozens in Baghdad.

February 
February 3 Suicide bombers killed at least 15 people and injured 70 others in Kirkuk.
February 8 Bombings targeted Shiite areas killing 33 people and wounding 100 others.
February 17 Car bombs killed 37 people and wounded more than 100 others in Baghdad.

March 
March 17 A car bomb near Basra killed 10 people.
March 19 Bombings in Baghdad killed 56 people and injured 200.

April 
April 12 A series of bomb attacks killed at least 11 people and wounded 30 others.
April 15 Bombs killed 33 people and wounded dozens across Iraq.

May 
May 15 Bombs killed 35 people across Iraq.
May 20 A dozen car bombs across Iraq killed at least 84 people and wounded more than 200.

June 
June 8 Car bombs killed 5 people and wounded 20 others.
June 10 Five car bombs killed 29 people and wounded 80 others in Mosul.

July 
July 14 A wave of terrorist bombings killed 34 people and wounded 126 others.
July 20 A wave of car bombs killed 65 people across Iraq.

August 
August 6 Car bombs killed 36 people in and around Baghdad.
August 10 A wave of terrorist incidents including car bombs killed 69 people across Iraq.
August 25 Terrorist bombings across Iraq killed 46 people and wounded 80 others.

September 
September 13 A bomb placed in a mosque killed 30 people and injured 45 others.
September 21 Suicide bombers killed 72 people and wounded 120 others at a Shiite funeral.
September 29 A suicide bomber killed 40 people and wounded dozens in a Shiite town.

October 
October 7 A wave of terrorist bombings killed at least 38 people mainly in Baghdad.
October 20 A suicide bombing killed 35 people and wounded 45 in Baghdad.
October 27 A dozen terrorist incidents mainly car bombs killed 55 people.

November 
November 14 A wave of bombings targeting Shiites killed at least 41 people and wounded 80 others.
November 21 A series of bombings across Iraq killed at least 45 people and wounded 54 others.

December 
December 25: 2013 Baghdad Christmas Day bombings: 3 bombings targeting Christians in Baghdad killed 37 people and wounded 59 others.

See also 
List of terrorist incidents in January–June 2013
List of terrorist incidents in July–December 2013
Timeline of the Iraqi insurgency (2013)
List of bombings during the Iraqi insurgency (2011–2013)
Terrorist incidents in Iraq in 2012
Terrorist incidents in Iraq in 2014

References 

 
2013 in Iraq
Iraq
2013